The Lovell House or Lovell Health House is an  International style modernist residence designed and built by Richard Neutra between 1927 and 1929. The home, located at 4616 Dundee Drive in the Los Feliz neighborhood of Los Angeles, California, was built for the physician and naturopath Philip Lovell. It is considered a major monument in architectural history, and was a turning point in Neutra's career.

It is often described as the first steel frame house in the United States, and also an early example of the use of gunite (sprayed-on concrete). Neutra was familiar with steel construction due to his earlier work with the Chicago firm Holabird & Roche. Neutra served as the contractor for the project in order to manage the cost and quality.

History
Philip Lovell was enchanted with the house and praised his architect publicly. Lovell had previously commissioned architect Rudolf Schindler to build the landmark Lovell Beach House in 1926. Neutra and Schindler were contemporaries in Europe and the Neutras lived with the Schindlers (Schindler House) when they first settled in Los Angeles in 1925. Lovell chose Neutra instead of Schindler to build his Los Angeles home while they were living under the same roof.  Neutra was known for his relationships with his clients—he thought of himself as a therapist and the client his patient.  He spent time getting to know his clients and analyzed their needs.

The Lovell House was purchased in 1961 by Morton and Betty Topper. It was added to the list of Registered Historic Places in Los Angeles in 1971.

In 2021, art dealers Iwan and Manuela Wirth purchased the property for $8.75 million, "with plans to bring back its original lustre."

Design
The , three-story house aesthetically follows many of the principles of the International Style. It was included in the 1932 exhibit at the Museum of Modern Art in New York that retrospectively defined the style. In essence it reflects Neutra's interest in industrial production, and this is most evident in the repetitive use of factory-made window assemblies. In fact, Neutra's apprentice Harwell Hamilton Harris suggested that Neutra was drawn to America because of Henry Ford.

The interior reflects Neutra's interest in Cubism, transparency, and hygiene. The "minimal" detailing shows the influence of Irving Gill. In another nod to industrial production, Neutra installed two Ford Model-A headlights in the main stairwell. (The headlights were provided by Neutra apprentice Gregory Ain.) The Historic American Buildings Survey described the Lovell House as "a prime example of residential architecture where technology creates the environment."

In film productions
The house was used in the 1997 film L.A. Confidential as the home of Pierce Morehouse Patchett, played by David Strathairn. It was also depicted in the film Beginners (Mike Mills, 2010) as the home of Oliver (Ewan McGregor) and his father Hal (Christopher Plummer).

See also
Lovell Beach House
Los Angeles Historic-Cultural Monuments in Hollywood and Los Feliz

Notes

External links
Great buildings online

Richard Neutra buildings
Houses on the National Register of Historic Places in Los Angeles
Historic American Buildings Survey in California
Houses completed in 1929
Modernist architecture in California
International style architecture in California
Los Feliz, Los Angeles